Nocardioides dokdonensis is a bacterium from the genus Nocardioides which has been isolated from sand sediments from the beach of the Dokdo Island, Korea.

References

External links
Type strain of Nocardioides dokdonensis at BacDive -  the Bacterial Diversity Metadatabase	

dokdonensis
Bacteria described in 2008